Big Brother 2008, also known as Big Brother 9, was the ninth series of the British reality television series Big Brother. The show followed twenty-one contestants, known as housemates, who were isolated from the outside world for an extended period of time in a custom built House. Each week, one or more of the housemates were eliminated from the competition, and left the House. The last remaining housemate, Rachel Rice, was declared the winner, winning a cash prize of £100,000.

The series launched on Channel 4 on 5 June 2008 and ended on 5 September 2008, lasting 93 days - the joint-second longest British edition of Big Brother to date (together with the seventh and tenth series, and one day shorter than the eighth series). Davina McCall returned as presenter for her ninth consecutive year. Sixteen housemates entered on launch night, with an additional five being introduced in later weeks. The series was watched by an average of 3.6 million viewers.

Big Brother 9 was the subject of viewer complaints and press attention regarding a variety of controversial scenes, including the ejection of two housemates for breaking rules regarding unacceptable behaviour, in separate incidents.

Broadcasts
The series was launched on 5 June 2008, and ran for 13 weeks until 5 September 2008. This series started later than normal. It was rumoured that this was so that it did not clash with Britain's Got Talent, which was being aired on ITV during May. Auditions were held from 21 November 2007 to 25 January 2008. The main show for the program was a highlights show, shown at 10 pm on Monday to Wednesday, then at 9 pm on Thursday to Sunday, with each program lasting an hour. Each Friday a housemate was evicted, the announcement of the loser of the public vote was announced live by Davina McCall at the end of the first of two programs shown on the Friday. There was then a second program at 10.30 pm when McCall interviews the evictee, this second program usually lasted until 11.00 pm, unless there was a change in plans (such as new housemates going in or a double eviction) then the program was longer. For the first time since Big Brother 4 all of McCall's interactions with the house (except for the final night) took place in a studio to stop the crowd chants from influencing the housemates and to enforce the fundamental rule of "no contact with the outside world." This new medium of communicating with the house would continue into the next celebrity and civilian series.

In the final week, the Monday program was moved to 9 pm, there were two programs broadcast on the Tuesday, both hosted by McCall, the first at 8 pm and the second at 10 pm, when two Housemates were evicted. On Wednesday and Thursday the highlights show was shown at 9 pm. Then for the finale there were two programs starting at 8 pm and 10.30 pm with an hour and half-hour break in between. 
Live streaming on E4 of events in the house was again missing because of the decision to keep E4 Music during the series' run rather than taking a break until the series is over. For the first time in the show's history, there was no live web stream.
The series was accompanied with the shows Big Brother's Big Mouth, Big Brother's Little Brother and Diary Room Uncut. Zezi Ifore and George Lamb replaced Dermot O'Leary as the hosts of Big Brother's Little Brother whilst Big Brother's Big Mouth was hosted by a different guest host each week, beginning with Jack Whitehall. Chris Moyles took over for the first full week inside the Big Brother House.
The weekly podcast made by the housemates in BB8 was axed for BB9, with a 60-minute radio show Big Brother's Big Ears as its replacement. Like the podcast, it was available for download on the Channel 4 website and was hosted by Iain Lee and Gemma Cairney. It aired twice a week on a Tuesday and Friday (after the Live Eviction) at 11.30 pm.

Logo
The official eye motif was revealed on 12 May 2008, on the official Big Brother website. This year's eye had a shattered effect, leading to some speculation that Big Brother was going to be evil again, just like BB5. It was later announced that BB9's theme was to be 'zero tolerance', which confirmed some speculation of a somewhat harsher Big Brother. In 2011, it was ranked the public's favourite Big Brother eye ever. Each Big Brother show shared the same logo but with a different coloured shard to reflect the show; Big Brother's Big Mouth was green, Big Brother Live and Diary Room Uncut were red, Big Brother's Little Brother was orange and Big Brother's Big Ears was purple.

House

As with all Big Brother series' since Big Brother 3 in 2002, the House was located in Borehamwood, Hertfordshire, just north of London, and was completely rebuilt with a new look for the 2008 series. The first images of the House were released in late May and showed the kitchen, living area, bathroom, one of the two bedrooms, and parts of the garden. The initial set of pictures revealed a lavish, Romanesque bathroom and a red kitchen fitted with triangular furniture and wall slats facing inwards, The bedroom shown (which the housemates nicknamed "B-Block") contains only eight beds surrounded by lockers and the garden was enlarged with vibrant colours and an ashtray in which housemates may smoke. The dining table had only eight seats when first shown to the public; it was later shown during the launch that there was a second adjoining table.
On 4 June 2008, only one day before the launch of the series, Channel 4 released images of the luxury bedroom and for the first time before the launch show in the programme's history, the Diary Room. The luxury bedroom was accessed via the garden and contains eight double beds with an oval wardrobe built into the back. The Diary Room was in between the two sets of stairs by which housemates entered and exited the House (they join at the top). This meant that the housemates had to exit the House through the main doorway to enter the Diary Room; however, the Diary Room button that the housemates used to notify Big Brother of their intent to go to the Diary Room was located next to the main door inside the House. Outside the bathroom were tokens, which housemates bought from the shopping list and gave to Big Brother if they wanted to use hot water or get rewards. The tokens were not returned afterwards. When the house was split into Heaven and Hell, the garden had to be modified, with a new outside bathroom in "hell" and the seating area in heaven was located as the smoking area.
Other areas in the House included, for the first time, a jail for housemates who break the rules. Located in a wall of the garden, the jail had a door which locked automatically when housemates entered and was exposed to the elements but did have bars so that housemates could not escape. On launch night, Davina McCall revealed that there is also a solitary confinement space in the House; it is accessed via the Diary Room. It was used as a "task room" for various tasks. In addition, a Nominations Pod was placed outside the luxury bedroom. Once housemates entered the pod, they were free to discuss nominations; however, upon exiting the pod, the regular rules regarding nominations applied.
Early in the morning of Day 32 (6 July 2008), the Big Brother house was evacuated because of a bomb scare. All housemates were removed for their own safety while Hertfordshire Police carried out a thorough search of the premises at around 1:15 am. The scare was eventually declared a hoax and the housemates returned and the show resumed. The live feed was cut during the evacuation and search and didn't resume until 4:00 am.

The House has been used after the series for the shooting of graphics for the home page of the Big Brother horror spin off Dead Set.

House split 
On Day 37, after Mario Marconi's eviction, McCall announced that over the weekend housemates will elect a Head of House, who would be in control of the whole house.  It was also revealed that the house would be split in two, with one side being 'heaven' and the other 'hell'. Heaven had all the best seats, the entire swimming pool, sole access to the luxury bedroom and bathroom. Heavenly housemates had the right to smoke wherever they wish, as long as they remained in the garden, as well as sole right to the prison. Hell, on the other hand, had few seats, no swimming pool, sole access to the kitchen, meaning they had to cook for the "Heavenly" housemates as well, "B-Block" (the basic bedroom) and outdoor cold showers. Hellish housemates must also earn their right to nominate.

On Day 65, after Dale Howard's eviction, McCall announced that the divide between Heaven and Hell would be removed. Despite this, a new Head of House was appointed the next day and the housemates re-allocated between Heaven and Hell. The next day, the fence came down.

Head of House 
The Head of House is responsible for doing the shopping list and deciding who does what in the shopping task. The Head of House is immune from being nominated for the week they hold the title, but they can still nominate others. The Head of House does not participate in any of the weekly shopping tasks, but supervises instead. Once a housemate has been Head of House they could not stand a second time, but could compete to stay in heaven. After the divide was removed, only eligible housemates competed to become Head of House, except for Week 12 when all housemates were eligible. On Day 88 all previous Heads of House joined Mohamed Mohamed in becoming Head of House for one day, putting an end to the role of Head of House.
In week 6, on Day 38, housemates elected their Head of House. Dale, Luke Marsden and Darnell Swallow stood for election. Darnell won and was crowned first Head of House.
In week 7, on Day 45, three housemates were chosen to compete for Head of House in a competition. They had to hang from a tyre for as long as possible, with the one staying for the longest time winning the title. Dale won and was crowned second head of House.
In week 8, on Day 52, Big Brother called all housemates individually to the diary room, and gave each eight chili peppers to eat. Each chili pepper was assigned a certain number of points. The housemate that scored the most points by eating the peppers would win the title of Head of House. Stuart Pilkington won and was crowned the third Head of House.
In week 9, on Day 59, Big Brother called all housemates individually to the Diary Room, to take part in the challenge of saying the alphabet backwards. The eligible housemate that did it in the fastest time would become Head of House, Rachel was second fastest after Darnell and became the fourth Head of House.
In week 10, on Day 66, housemates from Hell and housemates from Heaven had to make cakes resembling famous London landmarks, with Hell recreating the Millennium dome and Heaven recreating Saint Paul's Cathedral. Head of House Rachel had to choose which cake was best and picked Hell's. As a result, housemates from Hell had to decide which one of them would become the next head of house, they chose Michael to become the fifth Head of House.
In week 11, on Day 73, housemates eligible to become Head of House (Kathreya Kasisopa, Lisa Appleton, Mohamed, Nicole Cammack, Rex Newmark and Sara Folino) had to paint themselves with the paint and sponges provided to look like statues. They had to stay still as a statue until one of them was left and they would become the new Head of House. Rex won and became the sixth Head of House.
In week 12, on Day 82, housemates voted for who they wanted to be the next HoH, instead of nominating for eviction. Mohamed received 4 votes and as HoH was immune from eviction that week. Unlike previous weeks all housemates were eligible for HoH.
On Day 88 the role of Head of House finished.

 Colour key
 Won the title of Head of House
 Eligible to become Head of House
 Not in the house at the time
 Was not eligible to become Head of House, having previously been Head of House.

(*) Darnell, Kathreya and Mohamed all ate a banana from the gorilla task, therefore their punishment was living in Hell the upcoming week.
(**) Stuart was stripped of his Head of House title after discussing nominations. He was not replaced as Head until Rachel took over.

Housemates

A total of 21 housemates entered the Big Brother house in this series. On Day 1, the original sixteen housemates entered the Big Brother House. Alexandra De-Gale was ejected on Day 14. Stuart Pilkington, entered the House on Day 16 as a replacement for Alexandra. For the first time since Big Brother 5, a second housemate, Dennis McHugh, was ejected on Day 23. Sara Folino, Maysoon Shaladi and Belinda Harris-Reid entered the house on Day 30, to replace Dennis. Maysoon walked on Day 56 and was replaced two days later by Nicole Cammack, Rex's girlfriend, who entered on Day 58.

Weekly summary

Nominations table

Notes

 : There were no nominations in Week 1. Instead, the result of the secret mission given to Mario, Lisa, Stephanie and Luke determined whether they or the remaining 12 housemates would face the public vote. As they failed the task, the four of them faced eviction.
 : Because Alexandra was ejected, the second eviction was cancelled. During the time the lines were available to vote, Alexandra had received 87% of the public vote.
 : As a new housemate, Stuart could not nominate and could not be nominated by his fellow housemates.
 : As punishment for discussing nominations, Big Brother sent Luke to jail, meaning he could not nominate. However, Rebecca used a "Get Out of Jail Free" card – one of Big Brother's Ever Changing Special Prizes bought in the weekly shopping Budget, to get out of jail. He was then allowed to nominate.
 : As new housemates, Belinda, Maysoon and Sara could not nominate and could not be nominated by their fellow housemates.
 : As Darnell was Head of House he could nominate but could not be nominated by his fellow housemates. Hell Housemates had to peel potatoes to nominate.
 : As Dale was Head of House he could nominate but could not be nominated by his fellow housemates. Hell Housemates had to chop onions to nominate.
 : Dale and Luke were nominated for eviction by their fellow housemates. However, Darnell, Kathreya, Maysoon, Mohamed, Rachel, Rex and Stuart discussed nominations in secret code, so as a punishment they also faced the public vote. At the time of nominations Stuart was Head of House and could nominate, but could not be nominated by his fellow housemates. Therefore, Lisa, Michael and Sara were the only housemates not to face eviction this week. After the phone lines were opened Maysoon decided to walk from the House, her line was therefore closed.
 : As a new housemate, Nicole could not nominate and could not be nominated by her fellow housemates. As Rachel was Head of House, she also could not be nominated by her fellow housemates, but could still nominate. Housemates from Hell Kathreya and Michael failed to eat a container of Brussels Sprouts and were unable to nominate. As punishment for crossing the divide to hell, Darnell was banned from nominating.
 : As Head of House, Michael could nominate but could not be nominated by his fellow housemates.
 : As Head of House, Rex could nominate, but could not be nominated by his fellow housemates.
 : The housemates voted for who they wanted to become the new Head of House. Mohamed was voted as new Head of House and guaranteed a place in the final week. Housemates then nominated face-to-face using whiteboards and pens. The two housemates with the most nominations, Lisa and Sara, took part in a task in which they could win some of the prize money. Lisa and Sara chose to share half of the prize fund and won £25,000 each.
 There were no nominations in the final week. The public voted for who they want to win, rather than evict. On Day 90, there was a surprise double eviction during a party. Mohamed and Kathreya were evicted, leaving Darnell, Michael, Rachel, Rex and Sara on the final night.

Controversy

Removal of Alexandra
Within the first week of the series, media watchdog Ofcom and Channel 4 had collectively received over 433 complaints about alleged bullying from housemate Alexandra, after an argument broke out between her and the other housemates regarding oven chips. Channel 4 defended its housemate selection, claiming that the production team were closely watching the housemates as they normally do to ensure the safety of the housemates. The broadcaster also noted that Alexandra had been warned that her behaviour could be deemed threatening. On Day 14 she was ejected from the house after apparently threatening to have housemates who nominated her for eviction dealt with by her "gangster friends".

Removal of Dennis
Early in the morning on Day 23, at around 12:30am an argument broke out when Rex rubbed a piece of pizza on Jennifer's winning drawing of Stuart from the life drawing task earlier in the week, causing it to smudge. Upset by this, Jennifer retreated to the luxury bedroom and was comforted by Dennis.

Rex apologized to Jennifer shortly afterwards but despite seemingly accepting that he was sorry, Jennifer became increasingly agitated and upset by his actions. This attracted a large number of housemates to the luxury bedroom including Lisa, Dale, Stuart, Rebecca, Sylvia and Luke to continue to express sympathy for Jennifer. Dale and Stuart in particular became very angry at the situation and both confronted Rex separately about the incident, seemingly unaware that Rex had already spent several minutes apologising to her.

Rex then returned to the luxury bedroom with Mohamed to once again apologise to Jennifer, during which time he came under intense criticism from Dale, Lisa, Stuart and Rebecca. Mohamed would stick up for Rex during the argument at which point Dale, Stuart and Rebecca became angry at him for getting involved in the discussion. Mohamed was then confronted by both Rebecca and Dale and whilst arguing with Dale, Dennis became extremely angry and shouted "fuck off" to Mohamed several times before appearing to spit in his face. Dennis was immediately called to the Diary Room by Big Brother and at the same time Mario escorted an upset and shaken Mohamed to the bathroom to wash his face.

Whilst waiting to enter the Diary Room, Dennis, clearly under the influence of Alcohol taunted Mohamed over claims that he was homophobic, something which Mohamed had strenuously denied. Dennis then entered the Diary Room and was told to remain there by Big Brother until he calmed down.

Darnell, who was aware of the incident with the painting but unaware of what had occurred between Dennis and Mohamed, became enraged upon discovering this information. He then returned to the luxury bedroom to confront the other housemates as they were all seemingly supportive of Dennis. Darnell had to be restrained and calmed down by Dale, Lisa and Sylvia before Dale escorted him back to the other bedroom. However Mohamed and Dale then had another heated exchange before they were finally separated. The live feed of the House was then cut at this point, but most of the argument, its build-up and repercussions were included in the highlights the following night.

After a conversation with Big Brother, Dennis was allowed to return to the house, and the housemates were split into two groups with Mohamed, Rex, Darnell and Mario being instructed to stay in the main bedroom and all the other housemates in the luxury bedroom, where they remained until the morning.

Dennis was then summoned back into the Diary Room where Big Brother informed him that by spitting in Mohamed’s face he had broken strict rules regarding unacceptable behaviour and was subsequently removed from the house with immediate effect.

Several of the other housemates, including Dale, Stuart, Darnell, Jennifer and Mohamed had one-on-one conversations with Big Brother about the incident throughout the day, after which they all made peace with one-another and put the incident to bed.

Bullying of Sara
During week 12, Darnell and Rex both received warnings of unacceptable behaviour from Big Brother after they appeared to be bullying Sara. This was after more than 1500 people complained to Ofcom about their alleged sexist behaviour.

Ratings
All ratings are taken from British Audience Research Board, a consortium that announces viewing figures that are considered "official".

References

External links
 Official website

2008 British television seasons
 9